Qāżi Aḥmad Borhān al-Din (8 January 1345 –  1398) was an Oghuz Turkic vizier to the Eretnid rulers of Anatolia. In 1381 he took over Eretnid lands and claimed the title of sultan for himself. He is most often referred to by the title Qadi, a name for Islamic judges, which was his first occupation.

Origin and early career
He was born on 8 January 1345 in Kayseri. His father, Muhammad Shams al-Din, like his grandfather and great-grandfather, was a kadi, descended from the Oghuz Turkic tribe of Salur. His father gave him his first education, which he furthered in Egypt, Damascus, and Aleppo. When he returned to his hometown in 1364/65, one year after his father's death, the local ruler, the Eretnid Giyath al-Din Muhammad, so esteemed his education and character that he gave the young man not only the post of kadi, but also the hand of his daughter.

Despite this unusual favour, Burhan al-Din secretly participated in the rebellion of the local magnates (beys) in which Giyath al-Din was killed in 1365. The latter's successors were incompetent, and Burhan al-Din rose further to the posts of vizier and atabeg, before proclaiming himself as the sovereign sultan of the Eretnid domains in 1381/82, establishing his residence at Sivas.

Reign
The Eretnid sultanate he inherited had a large Turkmen and Mongol population but also contained many of the older, established urban centers of the Seljuks of Rum and Ilkhanid Anatolia. The sultanate  resembled these older states more than the Turkmen beyliks then ascendant in other parts of Anatolia.

The Kadi's eighteen-year rule was not peaceful, being consumed with internal rebellions as well as conflicts with powerful neighbours, including the Karamanids and the emerging Ottoman Empire. He challenged the Turkmen Karamanids and Beylik of Erzincan and twice fought Kötürüm Bayezid, the Jandarid bey of Kastamonu. 

In 1387, he was defeated by the Mamluks of Egypt, but soon allied with them against the Ak Koyunlu, only to later ally with the latter against rebellions of the beys of Amasya and Erzincan. The Ottoman Sultan Bayezid I, accompanied by his vassal the Byzantine Emperor Manuel II Palaeologos, campaigned against Burhan al-Din in 1391, but was defeated at the Battle of Kırkdilim. 

When he ordered the execution of the rebel governor of Kayseri, Sheikh Mu'ayyad, the Ak Koyunlu ruler Qara Osman turned against him. The Kadi was defeated, captured and executed by Qara Osman. Some sources give the date as July/August 1398, although other sources differ on the site and exact date, and his türbe (tomb) at Sivas bears no date. His son Muhammad (d. 1391) and his daughter Habiba Seljuk-Khatun (d. 1446/7) are also buried there.

He was succeeded by his son Zayn al-‘Abidin, who ruled for a short time between 1398 and 1399.

Poetry 
He was an outstanding poet, who wrote in Turkish and Persian. He played significant role in the development of the Azerbaijani poetry. His diwan comprises 1,500 ghazals, 119 tuyughs, and a few distichs. According to Jan  Rypka, he was "a poet of profane love; mystical notes are sounded more rarely in his work". Despite his ability, he was relatively unknown, and his work had little influence on later Azerbaijani or Ottoman poetry.

He also composed two juridical works in Arabic, the Tardjīh al-tawḍīḥ in May 1397, and the Iksīr al-saʿādāt fī asrār al-ʿibādāt, which has remained in use until the present day.

Biography
'Aziz ibn Ardashir Astarbadi, a companion of Kadi Burhan al-Din, wrote a Persian language history of his rule called Bazm-u Razm which was edited by M. F. Köprülüzade in 1928. An analysis and commentary has been provided by H. H. Giesecke, Das Werk des ‘Azīz ibn Ardašīr Astarābādi (Leipzig, 1940).

References

1345 births
1398 deaths
14th-century monarchs in Asia
Azerbaijani-language poets
History of Sivas Province
History of Kayseri Province
Atabegs
Anatolian beyliks
Sharia judges
People from Kayseri
Turkic rulers
Hanafis
Maturidis
Qadis
14th-century Turkic people
Salur tribe
14th-century Persian-language poets